Sittichok Kannoo (born August 9, 1996), simply known as Ice, is a Thai professional footballer who plays as a forward for Thai League 1 club Ratchaburi.

Club career

Kannoo scored his first ever goal for Buriram United in the 75th minute with a great effort to equalize against Nakhon Ratchasima in an eventual 1-1 draw.

International career

He won the 2011 AFF U-16 Youth Championship with Thailand U17.
In August 2017, he won the Football at the 2017 Southeast Asian Games with Thailand U23.

Personal life

Sittichok's older brother Attaphon Kannoo is also a footballer.

International goals

U16

U19

U23

Honours

International
Thailand U-23
 Sea Games  Gold Medal (1); 2017
 Dubai Cup (1) :  2017

Club
Buriram United
 Thai League 1 (1): 2015
 Thai FA Cup (1): 2015
 Thai League Cup (1): 2015
 Toyota Premier Cup (1): 2016
 Kor Royal Cup (1): 2015
 Mekong Club Championship (1): 2015

International
Thailand U-16
 AFF U-16 Youth Championship (1): 2011
Thailand U-23
 Dubai Cup (1) :  2017

References

External links
 

1996 births
Living people
Sittichok Kannoo
Sittichok Kannoo
Association football forwards
Sittichok Kannoo
Sittichok Kannoo
Sittichok Kannoo
Sittichok Kannoo
Sittichok Kannoo
Southeast Asian Games medalists in football
Competitors at the 2017 Southeast Asian Games